Oxysarcodexia is a genus of flies belonging to the family Sarcophagidae.

The species of this genus are found in Australia and America.

Species:
 Oxysarcodexia admixta (Lopes, 1933) 
 Oxysarcodexia adunca Lopes, 1975

References

Sarcophagidae